In the United Kingdom, singles are certified Platinum by the British Phonographic Industry (BPI) when they pass 600,000 units as measured by the Official Charts Company. Since July 2013, this has been automatically applied by the BPI as a single reaches the threshold of any multiple of 600,000 rather than relying on the record companies to apply for the awards or limiting awards to releases after 1973 (when the awards system was first set up).

Since 1 January 1989, the number of sales required to qualify for Silver, Gold and Platinum discs has been 200,000, 400,000 and 600,000, respectively. Prior to this, the thresholds were 250,000 (Silver), 500,000 (Gold) and 1,000,000 (Platinum). For singles released before the current thresholds, only digital sales since 2005 are used to calculate the certification: so, for example, "Eye of the Tiger" by Survivor was a Gold record from 1982 (500,000 copies) and passed 1 million sales before 2010, but was certified Platinum only in 2014 for 600,000 digital sales (streams and downloads), while its total sales exceeded 1.46 million.

From February 2005, downloads became eligible and for awards made in or after July 2014, audio streaming has been included at a rate of 100 streams equivalent to one unit (with any streams from the start of 2014 being counted).

In the tables below the certifications are all multiples of 600,000 units unless otherwise stated and separated according to whether streaming is included. On 22 July 2013, a large number of certifications were made for singles whose sales passed awards thresholds once digital sales since 2005 were added, and again in July 2014 once audio streams from the start of 2014 were added.

Artists with the most Multi-Platinum singles
The artist with the most Multi-Platinum singles in the UK is Ed Sheeran, with 23.

Multi-Platinum awards

5 Million Units

9× Platinum
"Shape of You" is the only song to go 9× Platinum in the 21st century (5,400,000 units). When it passed 5× Platinum, its total was made up of 764,737 downloads and 2,241,667 sales-equivalent streams.

4 Million Units

8× Platinum
"Perfect" was the second song to go 8× Platinum in the 21st century (4,800,000 units)

7× Platinum
"Perfect" was the second song to go 7× Platinum in the 21st century (4,200,000 units)
"All I Want for Christmas Is You" is the first song ever by a female artist to reach 7× platinum.

3 Million Units

6× Platinum

"Uptown Funk" is the latest release to sell a million copies, having sales of 1.39 million by June 2015, implying that it had been streamed more than 41 million times by the time it reached 3× Platinum status and over 80 million times when it reached 4× Platinum.

5× Platinum
"Happy" was the first song certified 3× Platinum after streaming was included, having sold 1.55 million copies by July 2014 and been streamed over 25 million times from January to July 2014.

2 Million Sales

4× Platinum

1 Million Sales

3× Platinum
"Anything Is Possible" / "Evergreen" by Pop Idol winner Will Young is the only single since 2000 to achieve 3× Platinum based on shipments at its original release (sales estimates by the Official Charts Company put it just short of 1.8 million). "Barbie Girl" by Aqua and "Believe" by Cher were both released before 2000 and benefited from changes in eligibility rules which allowed downloads (and streaming in the case of "Believe") to be counted for any song regardless of release date.

The first single to achieve 3× Platinum without selling a million copies was "Sorry" by Justin Bieber, which had more than 100 million streams by August 2016.

Ed Sheeran has ten singles certified triple platinum or above, Justin Bieber has five, whilst both Lady Gaga and Pharrell Williams have three.

2× Platinum
The artists with the most double platinum awards is Ed Sheeran

Sales or shipments only

Previously awarded 2× Platinum in 1996

Including streaming (certified July 2014 onwards)

Artists with the most Platinum singles
The artist with the most Platinum singles in the UK is Ed Sheeran, with 45.

Platinum awards
These lists exclude any song that appears above in the lists of multi-Platinum awards. Any certifications made since July 2014 include streaming regardless of the release date and are listed separately. The last song to be certified Platinum on sales or shipments only was "Brimful of Asha" by Cornershop, which was remixed by Norman Cook and reached number one in February 1998. It was certified Platinum on 13 June 2014.

Released before 2000 (sales or shipments only)

Released before 2000 (including streaming)

Pre-1989 release certified Platinum for digital sales since 2005.

Released between 2000 and 2009 (sales or shipments only)

Released between 2000 and 2009 (including streaming)

Released between 2010 and 2014 (sales or shipments only)

Released between 2010 and 2014 (including streaming)
All certifications since July 2014 include streaming.

Released since 2015
All of these include streaming.

References

External links
BPI Certified Awards

British music-related lists
Lists of best-selling singles in the United Kingdom
2000s in British music
2010s in British music
Music recording certifications